Peter Dani was a U.S. soccer player who earned two caps with the U.S. national team in 1976.  Both games were scoreless ties with Haiti in November.  The first came on the eleventh, and the second three days later.

Dani signed with German side Fortuna Düsseldorf.

Peter Dani died on 1 June 2002 from an accident in Duesseldorf, Germany.

References

American soccer players
United States men's international soccer players
Living people
Association football midfielders
Year of birth missing (living people)